Steve, Steven or Stephen Newman may refer to:

 Steven M. Newman (born 1954), listed in the Guinness Book of World Records as the first man to walk solo around the world
 Steve Newman (meteorologist), American broadcast meteorologist and editor of Earthweek: A Diary of the Planet
 Steve Newman (musician), South African acoustic guitarist
 Steve Newman (soccer) (1953–2012), retired American soccer forward
 Steven Newman (Australian footballer) (born 1965), retired Australian rules footballer
 Steven L. Newman (born c. 1967), American businessman.
 Stephen Newman (born 1964), member of the Virginia Senate